Comodoro Pedro Zanni Airport , also known as Pehuajó Airport, is an airport serving Pehuajó, a city in the Buenos Aires Province of Argentina.

The Pehuajo non-directional beacon (Ident: PEH) is located on the field.

See also

Transport in Argentina
List of airports in Argentina

References

External links
OpenStreetMap - Comodoro P. Zanni Airport

Airports in Buenos Aires Province